Vikram-class offshore patrol vessels are series of nine watercraft jointly built by Mazagon Dock Limited Mumbai and Goa Shipyard Limited, Vasco da Gama, Goa for the Indian Coast Guard.

Introduction
They are powered by two SEMT-Pielstick 16 PA6 V280 diesel engines driving two propellers. The vessels are equipped with pollution control equipment, two firefighting monitors, a four-tonne crane. They also carry diving equipment, two RIB inspection crafts, a grp launch, and a hangar for a light helicopter. The Vikram-class vessels have an air-conditioned accommodation for a crew of 11 officers and 85 enlisted sailors.

A derivative of this has been exported to Mauritius as the MCGS Barracuda.

List of vessels

See also

References

External links

Indian Coastguard official page
Goa Shipyard listing
Gross Tonnage listing
ICGS Vikram decommissioned

Fast attack craft of the Indian Coast Guard
Patrol ship classes
Ships of the Indian Coast Guard